Brad Guigar (born April 9, 1969) is an American cartoonist who is best known for his daily webcomic Greystone Inn and its sequel Evil Inc.

Early life
Brad Guigar was the eldest of five children and grew up in Bad Axe, Michigan. He attended Alma College where he received a Bachelor of Fine Arts degree before he moved to Canton, Ohio to work for the newspaper The Repository as a graphic artist and editorial cartoonist. He left The Repository and moved to Akron, Ohio and worked for the Akron Beacon Journal. He formerly worked at the Philadelphia Daily News and is married with two children. Guigar wrote and illustrated The Everything Cartooning Book (2004),
contributed to the book How To Make Webcomics (2008), wrote its sequel The Webcomics Handbook (2013), and maintains the site Webcomics.com.

Career

Greystone Inn
Greystone Inn premiered on the Web on February 14, 2000. Later that year, the strip was added to the Keenspot line-up of webcomics. After updating daily for over five years, Guigar took his comics, including Greystone to Blank Label Comics. Greystone Inn appeared in the Philadelphia Daily News, the Turlock Journal, the Stanford Daily and The Maine Campus. Selected Greystone Inn strips on graphic design also appeared in the Computer Arts magazine every issue. Guigar makes money off his syndications by offering Greystone Inn for syndication at a certain rate, with a lower rate offered for college papers.

Greystone Inn has had a spin-off comic written and drawn by Brad Guigar named Mondays With Mel. It featured an old comedian named Mel who had been introduced in Greystone Inn as an old friend of Argus's. It worked by Mel setting up a joke and then allowing the audience to provide punchlines with the best one being featured in the strip. Since Guigar left Keenspot, Mondays With Mel has been on hiatus and is no longer available online.

In May 2005 Guigar ended Greystone Inn and began a spin-off, Evil Inc., which focuses on a company of super-villains. Evil Inc. retains several Greystone Inn characters and has a similar style.

Courting Disaster
Courting Disaster is a single panel cartoon about love, sex, and dating. It originally appeared every Friday in the Philadelphia Daily News accompanying a sex advice column.  In 2015 Courting Disaster was revived for occasional release as a Not Safe For Work comic available to certain Patreon subscribers.

Phables
Phables was a comic strip about life in Philadelphia that appeared bi-weekly in the Philadelphia Daily News from 2006 to 2009. In May 2007 the strip was named "Best Local Column" by the Philadelphia chapter of the Society of Professional Journalists. Later in 2007, the strip was nominated for the Eisner Award for Best Digital Comic, eventually losing to Steve Purcell's Sam & Max.

Evil Inc.

A spin-off from Guigar's previous project, Greystone Inn, Evil Inc. debuted on the web on June 22, 2005. The strip chronicles the schemes and adventures of the eponymous Evil Incorporated, a business run by supervillains. One of the launch strips for Blank Label Comics until becoming part of the Halfpixel lineup, it appeared daily in newspapers until 2015. Artistically, Evil Inc. initially followed the form of most newspaper comics with black and white line-art style, shades of gray used sparingly. The Strip has since begun using color. Most strips are formed of a series of panels which use a multitude of camera angles.

The comic follows a strong story arc. In one, the corporation was bought, and subsequently brought to financial ruin, by the Legion of Justice (a parody of the Justice League and similar teams). However, the ruination of Evil, Inc. has also spelled doom for the Legion. Each strip maintains a self-contained joke, and the comic frequently parodies superhero comics and often uses puns.

Saturday strips are usually unconnected to weekday strips (the strip does not update on Sundays) and include such themes as Evil Inc. character profiles called "Personnel Files" (which describe a specific Evil Inc. character, usually one featured in the previous week), customer service calls fielded by Lightning Lady (who answers the phone "Evil Inc., how may I harm you?", previously "How may I misdirect your call?"), or, recently, various characters approaching a door that has been altered to complement the sign next to it (for example, the December 4, 2010 strip shows a door labeled "Office of Bizarro"; in this strip, the doorknob is placed next to the door rather than on it).

Evil Inc was nominated for the 2007 Web Cartoonist's Choice Awards in the category of Outstanding Superhero/Action Comic.

Webcomics.com
Webcomics.com is a paywalled website run by Guigar as a place for advice, discussing and job information relating to cartoons.

Charitable work
As a member of Alternative Brand Studios, Brad Guigar ran the AltBrand 2002 MDA Webcomic Telethon. It featured over 20 comic artists and raised $850.

As a founding member of Blank Label Comics, Guigar also spearheaded the 2005 Webcomic Telethon for Hurricane Relief that raised an estimated $28,635 for the American Red Cross response to hurricanes Katrina and Rita.

References

External links
 Greystone Inn
 Courting Disaster
 Evil Inc. 
 Phables
 The Webcomic Telethon for Hurricane Relief

American webcomic creators
Alma College alumni
Artists from Akron, Ohio
Living people
1969 births
People from Bad Axe, Michigan